The 2021–22 Providence Friars men's basketball team represented Providence College during the 2021–22 NCAA Division I men's basketball season. The team was led by 11th-year head coach Ed Cooley, and played their home games at Dunkin' Donuts Center in Providence, Rhode Island as a member of the Big East Conference. They finished the season 27–6, 14–3 in Big East play to win the school's first regular season championship. The Friars defeated Butler in the quarterfinals of the Big East tournament before losing to Creighton in the semifinals. They received an at-large bid to the NCAA  tournament as the No. 4 seed in the Midwest region. They defeated South Dakota State and Richmond to advance to the Sweet Sixteen. There they lost to No. 1 seed and national champion Kansas.

Previous season
In a season limited due to the ongoing COVID-19 pandemic, the Friars finished the 2020–21 season 13–13, 9–10 in Big East play to finish in sixth place. As the No. 6 seed in the Big East tournament, they lost to DePaul in the first round.

Offseason

Departures

Incoming transfers

Recruiting classes

2021 recruiting class

2022 recruiting class

Roster

Schedule and results
The Friars had games against Creighton, UConn, and Seton Hall canceled due to COVID-19 protocols. An additional game against Georgetown was originally canceled and then later rescheduled for January 20, 2022.
|-
!colspan=12 style=| Exhibition

|-
!colspan=12 style=| Non-conference regular season

|-
!colspan=12 style=| Big East regular season

|-
!colspan=9 style="|Big East tournament

|-
!colspan=9 style="|NCAA tournament

Source

Awards and honors

Big East Conference honors

All-Big East Awards
Coach of the Year: Ed Cooley
Sixth Man: Jared Bynum

All-Big East Second Team
Jared Bynum
Nate Watson

Sources

References

Providence Friars men's basketball seasons
Providence Friars
Providence Friars men's basketball
Providence Friars men's basketball
Providence